Pharrel Nnamdi Collins (born 10 January 2004) is a German footballer who plays as a defender for Borussia Dortmund.

Early life
Born in Düsseldorf, Germany, Collins spent time in the academy of Fortuna Düsseldorf.

Club career

Borussia Dortmund
Collins joined Borussia Dortmund in 2016, and rose quickly through the youth ranks, linking up with the U19 squad at the age of 16. Following these good performances, he was reportedly subject of a £2 million bid from English club Chelsea. However, he signed a new contract in May 2020, and was invited to train with the first team in March 2021.

Having been called up to the first team for pre-season friendlies, Collins featured in a 3–1 loss to fellow Bundesliga side VfL Bochum, however he went off injured after suffering a dislocated kneecap.

Collins is seen as one of the best young talents in Germany, due to his imposing height and lightning-quick pace.

International career
Collins has represented Germany at youth international level. He is also eligible to represent Nigeria through family.

References

External links
 

2004 births
Living people
Footballers from Düsseldorf
German sportspeople of Nigerian descent
German footballers
Germany youth international footballers
Nigerian footballers
Association football defenders
Fortuna Düsseldorf players
Borussia Dortmund players